KLXD (89.5 FM) is a K-LOVE affiliate station licensed to Victorville, California, and serving the Victor Valley area.

KLXD signed on in 1996 as KXRD, a simulcast of KLRD in Yucaipa, California, known as "K-Lord". Shortly after KXRD signed on, the stations were renamed "Air 1", marking the beginning of the Air 1 network.

KLXD also broadcasts its programming over the following translators: K204DR (88.7 FM) Laveen, Arizona, K218CO (91.5 FM) Klamath Falls, Oregon, K221GB (92.1 FM) Barstow, California, and K230AO (93.9 FM) Barstow, California.

External links

LXD
Victorville, California
Mass media in San Bernardino County, California
Radio stations established in 1996
1996 establishments in California
Educational Media Foundation radio stations
K-Love radio stations